Charles Baur (20 December 1929, Paris – 2 January 2015) was a French politician. He served as the longtime President of the Regional Council of Picardy from 1976 until 1978 and again from 1985 to 2004. He was a member of the Union for French Democracy (UDF) and a founding member of the now defunct Social Democratic Party.

Baur was born in Paris, France, on 20 December 1929. He served as the Mayor of Villers-Cotterets from 1954 to 1989.

Charles Baur was first elected President of the Regional Council of Picardy in 1976. He held the office for two years, before ceding it to his successor, Max Lejeune, in 1978. He regained the Presidency of the Regional Council in 1985. Baur won re-election in 1986 and 1992. He won re-election again in 1998, thanks to an alliance with the National Front.

He served as an MEP from December 1986 to 1989. In 1983, Baur was elected to the National Assembly of France representing Aisne's 2nd constituency as a member of the Union for French Democracy (UDF). He served as a deputy in the National Assembly from 28 March 1993 to 21 April 1997.

Baur retired from politics and the Presidency of the Regional Council of Picardy in 2004. The former President of COMIR, a French holding company, his estimated net worth was believed to be 85 million Euros, according to Challenges magazine.

Charles Baur died in Morocco on 2 January 2015, at the age of 85.

References

1929 births
2015 deaths
Politicians from Paris
French Section of the Workers' International politicians
Social Democratic Party (France) politicians
Deputies of the 10th National Assembly of the French Fifth Republic
Mayors of places in Hauts-de-France
Presidents of the Regional Council of Picardy
Union for French Democracy MEPs
MEPs for France 1984–1989
MEPs for France 1989–1994